Fernando Dinarte Santos Silva (born 3 October 1980), known simply as Fernando, is a Portuguese retired footballer. Mainly a central defender, he could also play as a defensive midfielder.

Football career
Fernando was born in Funchal, Madeira. After also playing youth football there he was promoted to local powerhouse C.S. Marítimo's first team for the 1999–2000 season, but served only as a backup for the vast majority of his 12-year spell.

On 30 September 2007, in a 1–1 away draw against C.F. Estrela da Amadora, Fernando scored the club's historical 1,000 goal in the Primeira Liga. However, he appeared in just five games during that campaign.

Fernando played a combined 23 league matches for Marítimo in the following three years – no appearances whatsoever in 2010–11 – continuing to feature for the reserves sporadically. At the age of 30 he moved abroad for the first time, signing with C.R.D. Libolo in Angola.

References

External links

1980 births
Living people
Sportspeople from Funchal
Portuguese footballers
Madeiran footballers
Association football defenders
Association football midfielders
Association football utility players
Primeira Liga players
Segunda Divisão players
C.S. Marítimo players
Girabola players
C.R.D. Libolo players
Portuguese expatriate footballers
Expatriate footballers in Angola
Portuguese expatriate sportspeople in Angola